Bobete is a community council located in the Thaba-Tseka District of Lesotho. Its population in 2006 was 12,966.

Villages
The community of Bobete includes the villages of

BobeteBoemaHa HeshepeHa KamoliHa KolahaliHa LebalaHa LephakhaHa LeruoHa MaanelaHa MaleluHa NtšasaHa RamokoboHa TheleliKhamolane

Khohlong KhokhothiKhotlengKhotoliengKhutlo-se-nonne LekhalongLetsatsengLichechengLihlabeng LihloahloengLikomengLilomongLiphokoaneng Lithotaneng

MabelengMabenyengMachakanengMafikeng MahahlengMahulengMajakanengMakenengMakhalong (Ha Mpela)MakhapungMakhoatsingMakhulengMalalaneng

ManokongMapotengMaqalikengMasalengMatheneng MathepengMatselengMatšumunyaneMohlanapengMojese MokhangoanengMoraongMothaleng

Noha-lia-loanaNqobelleNtširelePhalengPhofungPokalepheneQobengSekhutlongSekotingSekoting-sa-Mofao SetoetoeThaba-Khubelu Thotaneng

References

External links
 Google map of community villages

Populated places in Thaba-Tseka District
Thaba-Tseka District